Halographis is a genus of lichenized fungi in the family Roccellaceae; according to the 2007 Outline of Ascomycota, the placement in this family is uncertain. A monotypic genus, it contains the single species Halographis runica described in 1988.

References

Roccellaceae
Lichen genera
Monotypic Ascomycota genera